Guy Erez is a Los Angeles-based songwriter/producer, composer and virtuoso bass player. Born and raised in Israel, Erez moved to Los Angeles in 1992.  His songs have appeared in hit movies and TV shows including the soundtrack to the Oscar-winning film Crash, Grey's Anatomy and Beverly Hills 90210. He is a songwriter and producer on the theme to the Marvel/Disney series The Avengers, and his composer credits include NASA's official video that they released leading up to the launch of the James Webb Space Telescope.  He has also worked with artists such as Gipsy Kings, Jason Mraz, Miley Cyrus,  Ziggy Marley and Alan Parsons.

Songwriting and producing

One of Erez's first hit songs was BareNaked by Jennifer Love Hewitt, which he co-wrote with Meredith Brooks. The song made the Billboard Top 40 charts in 2002.  This brought attention to Chrysalis Music, who signed him to a publishing deal, adding him to their roster of staff songwriters.  During this time period, he also wrote and produced songs with artists including Holly Palmer and P.J. Olsson, garnering him another Billboard Top 40 hit with the Ryan Cabrera single "Shine On" for Atlantic Records.  Erez also contributed as both songwriter and producer for the title track "Shine" from the second solo album by Sam Bettens of K's Choice fame and The Gipsy Kings' Live at Kenwood House in London DVD released in 2006.  He also co-wrote the two most recent Alan Parsons singles with Parsons and P.J. Olsson, "Fragile", and "Do you Live at All".

Film and TV work

Erez has songs in over 100 films and TV shows.  His entre into TV was with a song called "Boom da Boom," which both Fox and Disney used to promote current shows including The Simpsons & King of the Hill.  This led to first MTV, then others bringing in Erez to compose on shows for them including The Tom Green Show, The Andy Dick Show (theme song & score), The Whitest Kids U' Know and others.  Since then, he has had songs in movies such as Van Wilder, The Perfect Score & Carolina plus TV shows like Grey's Anatomy, Beverly Hills 90210, NCIS, The Tonight Show and The Hills, amongst others. He was commissioned by Marvel to compose and produce the theme songs to the series The Avengers, Iron Man Extremis, Astonishing X-Men, and as composer on Marvel's Adaptive Audio Digital Comic, "Captain America, Winter Soldier." Erez more recently was the composer for the Emmy winning ABC television series Sea Rescue and the Emmy nominated TV series The Wildlife Docs. 2019 found Erez writing and producing a series of songs for the successful Netflix Original series, Super Monsters.

Bass player

Erez regularly works playing bass as a session musician.  He taught bass playing at Los Angeles Music Academy from 1996 to 2001.   His prolific bass performances can be heard in recordings such as the Florence & the Machine theme to Dragon Age II, and also while performing live such as with Randy Coleman opening for The Who at The Hollywood Bowl.  Starting in 2010 up through 2020 sees Erez on the road in the band Alan Parsons Live Project as the bass player.  He shared the bill in that time period with acts such as Simple Minds, Earth Wind & Fire and David Pack from Ambrosia.  He also played bass on Ziggy Marley's Grammy-winning album, "Fly Rasta."

Recent work

Erez is currently songwriting with Alan Parsons and co-wrote Parsons' singles "Fragile," "Do you Live at All," and "Miracle." He regularly writes, produces and plays bass for up-and-coming bands such as Kina Grannis, Karmina, Right the Stars and his most recent project Yacht Life.  Erez also continues to score music for companies like EA, Marvel and Disney on projects such as Marvel's 2014 Captain America Interactive Audio Digital Comic, and TV shows including the Emmy nominated ABC television series Sea Rescue and The Wildlife Docs. Erez's bass playing can be heard on recordings such as the Grammy-winning Ziggy Marley album "Fly Rasta," and the Miley Cyrus song "Hands of Love."

Selected discography

Main source for discography:

References

External links
 
 
 Guy Erez at Allmusic
 Guy Erez at Discogs.com
 Guy Erez at AlbumCredits.com

Year of birth missing (living people)
Living people
Israeli emigrants to the United States
Israeli male songwriters
Israeli record producers
Israeli guitarists